Faculty of Medicine, Diponegoro University is one of the leading  medical schools in Indonesia. Established on October 1, 1961, the medical school is officially affiliated to Dr. Kariadi Hospital the General Center Hospital in Central Java. In 2011, the medical school celebrated its 50 years of anniversary in giving contribution to the three basic goals of higher education which are medical education, research, and community services. 
Refer to the THES-QS Top World University Rankings in 2007, for the category of Life Science and Biomedicine, the medical school is ranked on 410th.

History
Since the Japanese occupancy in Semarang, there had been established a medical school, to provide the medical doctors. The medical school then sank with the ending of Japanese reign era.

In 1955 Djojo-bojo Foundation (with members team Boentaran M.D., and Atmadi Wreksoatmodjo M.D.) had an aspiration about establishing a new medical school at Semarang. But this effort was not really successful because of lack coordination between Head of Health Inspection with the Director of Hospital and Head of Department Health Semarang due to the political parties and status at that time. Even though there was a Hospital Medical Center in Semarang, which was quite representative to be a teaching hospital of a medical school.

In 1958, Heyder bin Heyder, M.D., and Soerarjo Darsono, M.D., met the Diponegoro University President, Mr. Soedarto, SH and delivered the idea of establishing a medical school, as Universitas Gadjah Mada medical students did their internship at Semarang General Hospital.

Universitas Diponegoro Foundation was established in 1959, with Faculty of Law, Faculty of Economics and Business, Faculty of Teaching and Education, also Faculty of Engineering. This fact led to the new idea of establishing a medical school.

During the Universitas Diponegoro Foundation meeting joint with the Universitas Diponegoro Senates on June 10, 1960, upon R. Atmadi Wreksoatmodjo M.D.’s idea, decided to establish a medical school of Universitas Diponegoro.

Establishment of a medical school committee was formed. The chair-person was Suyono Atmo, and secretary is Sri Widojati Notoprodjo, SH. Technical Committee was also formed, headed by Colonel R. Soehardi, M.D., secretary  Heyder bin Heyder, M.D., and members R. Kolonel, M.D., A. Soerojo, M.D., R. Marsaid S. Sastrodihardjo, M.D., Tjiam Tjwan Hok, M.D., and R. Soedjati, M.D.

Since 1951, Semarang General Hospital Center was an affiliate teaching hospital for the internship of Universitas Gadjah Mada Medical School, especially Department of Child Health, Department of Obstetrics and Gynecology, also Department of Otolaryngology Head And Neck Surgery. Although the medical students examination was done in Yogyakarta, but at least the Semarang General Hospital was experienced in teaching medical students, especially in clinical internship.

Technical committee on March 9, 1961 had a plenum, and the decisions are:

Hospital director is appointed as the ex official Dean of Medicine, and begins to do the preparation, while Heyder bin Heyder, M.D., as the vice Dean of Medicine, and also secretary.
Committee decides the Semarang General Hospital Medical Center is quite representative to be a teaching hospital.
Committee approves the medical education curriculum of 6 years education proposed by Atmadi Wreksoatmodjo, M.D.
Reckoning in the preclinical level education still needs time, the decision is still to open the higher level medical education. Information related to several senior medical students from Universitas Gadjah Mada Medical School who are ready to do exchange to Semarang
On March 29, 1961, Heyder bin Heyder, M.D., and Soerarjo Darsono, M.D. met Prof. Soedjono Djoened Poesponegoro, Dean of Medicine, Universitas Indonesia Medical School, looking for suggestions and advice and assistance as the preparation to establish a medical school in Semarang. Prof. Soedjono recognized and understood the committee and local people's aspiration, agreed that would give assistance (lecturers) from Universitas Indonesia Medical School, and realized in 1963.

There was a chairman change at Semarang General Hospital from Atmadi Wreksoatmodjo, M.D., to Soepaat Soemosoedirdjo, M.D., then on July 1, 1961, released the Universitas Diponegoro Presidential Decree No.782 C, about Soepaat Soemosoedihardjo, M.D. inauguration as the Dean of Medicine and Heyder bin Heyder, M.D., as the vice Dean of Medicine. Because Soepaat Soemosoedirdjo, M.D., who had just arrived from Klaten and had not recognized the procedural, Heyder bin Heyder, M.D. was assigned to carry out all activities.

The preparations done by R. Soerarjo Darsono, M.D., and Heyder bin Heyder, M.D., had negotiation with chairpersons of Universitas Gadjah Mada Medical School Yogyakarta and higher medical students of UGM. On July 12, 1961, one delegation consists of Soedarto SH (President of Universitas Diponegoro Semarang), Heyder bin Heyder, M.D. (medical school secretary) and Soepaat Soemosoedirdjo (Hospital Director) met Minister of Education Prof. Iwa Koesoemasoemantri who agreed about the establishment of a medical school.

Minister of Health, Prof. Satrio, M.D., agreed and suggested to give the Dean of Medicine position to an army due to Central Java condition at that time. Both Minister of Education and Minister of Health did not agree that the Dean of Medicine was also the Hospital Director. Then on July 12, 1961 at Jakarta, Colonel Soewondo, M.D., medical doctor of DKT KODAM VII as the Dean of Medicine and Heyder bin Heyder, M.D., head of Department Surgery as the vice of Dean.

Related to the previous agreements, on August 24, 1961 was held the last meeting, directed by Heyder bin Heyder, M.D., and attended by all heads of departments in Semarang General Hospital, Tendean M.D., from psychiatric hospital, and Go Gien Hoo, M.D. from Saint Elizabeth Hospital. They gave ideas and suggestions, also aspiration.

On August 31, 1961, held another meeting at Yogyakarta. Committee delegates were Soedarto, SH, Heyder bin Heyder, M.D., Sardjono Dhanoedibroto, M.D., Atmadi Wreksoatmodjo, M.D., and Soedjati Soemodiharjo, M.D.. From Universitas Gadjah Mada Medical School, Prof. Drs.Med Radiopoetro. And the decisions were:

The number of doctoral degree medical students from UGM those will be switched maximal 40 students. The switching has to be based on voluntary. Those students will be granted as medical students of Universitas Diponegoro and granted graduation certificate from Universitas Diponegoro. The medical school was officially inaugurated by Vice Minister of Higher Education and Science on the first Dies Natalis. Medical education begins from the higher level (internship) of 6 Doctorandus Medicine from UGM in 1961, and became 30 people in 1962. On October 1, 1962, educated the new medical students from the basic level.

Departments
Department of Anatomy
Department of Anesthesiology
Department of Biochemistry
Department of Child Health
Department of Clinical Pathology
Department of Dermatology
Department of Forensic Medicine
Department of Medical Biology
Department of Medical Chemistry
Department of Medical Pharmacy
Department of Medical Physics
Department of Medicine
Department of Microbiology
Department of Neurology
Department of Neurosurgery
Department of Nutrition Science
Department of Obstetrics and Gynaecology
Department of Ophthalmology
Department of Otorhinolaryngology - Head and Neck Surgery
Department of Parasitology
Department of Pathology
Department of Pharmacology
Department of Physical Medicine and Rehabilitation
Department of Physiology
Department of Public Health and Preventive Medicine
Department of Psychiatrics
Department of Radiology
Department of Surgery
Medical Education Development Unit
Center of Epidemiology and Biostatistics Unit
Ethics Commission for Health Research FMDU-Dr.Kariadi General Hospital

Programs
The faculty now offers five undergraduate programs, ten postgraduate programs, and five doctorate programs.

Undergraduate Programs
Medical Doctor
Dentistry
Pharmacy
Nutritional
Nursing

Apart from regular programs, the faculty also offers numerous resident specialty programs, sub-specialty programs, and fellowship programs.

Medical Specialty Programs
Anesthesiology
Cardiology and Vascular Medicine
Clinical Microbiology
Clinical Nutrition
Clinical Pathology
Dermatology and Venereology
Forensic Medicine
General Internal Medicine
Neurology
Neurosurgery (new)
Obstetrics and Gynecology
Ophthalmology
Otorhinolaryngology - Head and Neck Surgery
Pathology
Pediatrics
Physical Medicine and Rehabilitation
Psychiatry
Radiology
Surgery

Sub-Specialty Programs
Maternal-Fetal Medicine
Reproductive Endocrinology and Infertility
Internal Medicine Cardiovascular
Surgical Oncology
Surgical Urology

Teaching Hospital

Main Teaching Hospital
 Dr. Kariadi Hospital

Comprehensive Teaching Hospital
 Dr. Soesilo Hospital Tegal
 Sunan Kalijaga Hospital Demak
 RA. Kartini Hospital Jepara
 Blora Hospital Blora
 Rembang Hospital Rembang
 Rehatta Hospital Jepara
 Donorojo Leprosy Center Jepara

Network Teaching Hospital
 Batang Hospital Batang
 Kraton Hospital Pekalongan
 Tidar Hospital Magelang
 Tugurejo Hospital Semarang
 Ketileng Hospital Semarang
 Ungaran Hospital Ungaran
 Prof.Dr. Margono Soekarjo Hospital Purwokerto
 Dr. Amino Gondohutomo Psychiatric Hospital Semarang

Centers of Research and Excellence
 Medical Education Unit (MEDU Diponegoro)
 Center of Epidemiology and Biostatistics Unit (CEBU Diponegoro)
 Lab. Gangguan Akibat Kekurangan Yodium (GAKY)
 Center of Avian Influenza, Molecular and Clinical Microbiology
 Center for Tropical and Infectious Diseases (CENTRID)
 Center for Biomedical Research (CEBIOR)

See also
List of medical schools in Indonesia

References

External links
Faculty of Medicine Diponegoro University Website

Medical schools in Indonesia